Mike Endsley (born March 4, 1962) was a Wisconsin politician and legislator.

Early life and education 
Born in Sheboygan Falls, Wisconsin, Endsley graduated with a BS in Psychology from the University of Wisconsin–Platteville in 1984.

Wisconsin State Legislature 
He was elected to the Wisconsin State Assembly in 2010. He has described himself as a social conservative, and pro-life.

In March 2014, Endsley announced he would not seek a third term and was returning to the private sector.

References

  

University of Wisconsin–Platteville alumni
Republican Party members of the Wisconsin State Assembly
1962 births
Living people
People from Sheboygan Falls, Wisconsin
21st-century American politicians